CYP4F11 (cytochrome P450, family 4, subfamily F, polypeptide 11) is a protein that in humans is encoded by the CYP4F11 gene. This gene encodes a member of the cytochrome P450 superfamily of enzymes. The cytochrome P450 proteins are monooxygenases which catalyze many reactions involved in drug metabolism and synthesis of cholesterol, steroids and other lipids. This gene is part of a cluster of cytochrome P450 genes on chromosome 19. Another member of this family, CYP4F2, is approximately 16 kb away. Alternatively spliced transcript variants encoding the same protein have been found for this gene.

Expression
CYP4F11 is expressed in liver, kidney, heart, brain, and skeletal muscle and is overexpressed in ovarian and colon cancers; perhaps relativant to its overexpression in ovarian cancer, its gene has an estrogen receptor α responsive site in its Promoter (genetics) site.

Activities and possible functions
CYP4F11 is active in metabolism of many drugs including benzphetamine, ethylmorphine, chlorpromazine, imipramine, and erythromycin;.

The cytochrome is also able to hydroxylate short-chain and 3-hydroxylated medium chain fatty acidss by attaching a hydroxyl residue to their terminal carbon by omega oxidation in a reaction that may be critical to the processing of these fatty acids. It likewise omega-hydroxylates Vitamin Ks including menaquinone in a metabolic step which is essential for their further metabolism by beta oxidation and probably thereby their removal by catabolism to regulate their tissue levels.

CYP4F11 omega-hydroxylates leukotriene B4 (LTB4) to 20-hydroxy-LTB4, 5-Hydroxyicosatetraenoic acid (5-HETE) to 20-hydroxy-5-HETE (i.e. 5,20-diHETE), 12-hydroxyeicosatetraenoic acid (12-HETE) to 12,20-diHETE, lipoxins and possibly 5-oxo-eicosatetraenoic acid (5-oxo-ETE) to their 20-hydroxy metabolites; these reactions begin the inactivation of these pro- (LTB4, 5-HETE, 12-HETE, and 5-oxo-ETE) and anti- (lipoxins) cell signaling agents; however, it is relatively weak compared to, and therefore possibly not as physiologically relevant as, other CYP4Fs such as CYP4F2, CYP4F3a, CYP4F3b, CYP4A11 and CYP4F2  in doing so. The enzyme also hydroxylates arachidonic acid (i.e. eicosatetraenoic acid to 20-Hydroxyeicosatetraenoic acid) (20-HETE) although other cytochromes such as CYP4A11 and CYP4F2 appear more important in this metabolic conversion. 20-HETE is a short-lived potent signaling agent that functions to regulate blood flow, vascularization, blood pressure, and kidney tubule absorption of ions in rodents and possibly humans.  Gene polymorphism variants of CYP4A11 are associated with the development of hypertension and cerebral infarction (i.e. ischemic stroke) in humans (see 20-Hydroxyeicosatetraenoic acid).  In spite of its relative impotency and/or importance in accomplishing these omega-hydroxylations, CYP4F11 may contribute to them in certain tissues.

Further reading
Johnson AL, Edson KZ, Totah RA, Rettie AE. Cytochrome P450 ω-Hydroxylases in Inflammation and Cancer. Adv. Pharmacol. 74:223-62, 2015.

References

External links

Further reading